Martina Moravčíková (born August 13, 1988, Rimavská Sobota) is a Czech swimmer. At the 2012 Summer Olympics, she competed in the Women's 200 metre breaststroke, finishing in 26th place overall in the heats, failing to qualify for the semifinals. At the 2016 Olympic Games, she competed in the women's 100 m and 200 m breaststroke. She narrowly missed qualifying for the semifinals in the 200 m.

Personal and early life
Martina Moravčíková was born in 1988 to Ingrid Moravcikova and Jaroslav, a NATO officer. She resides in Tennessee where from 2010 to 2011 she attended University of Tennessee. There, she obtained a double major in global studies, language and world business. She enjoys extreme sports such as surfing and snowboarding. A huge admirer of Australian gold medalist Leisel Jones, she aspires to work in the American-Chinese import and export business.

References

1988 births
Living people
Czech female swimmers
Czech female breaststroke swimmers
Olympic swimmers of the Czech Republic
Swimmers at the 2012 Summer Olympics
Swimmers at the 2016 Summer Olympics
Universiade medalists in swimming
University of Tennessee alumni
Sportspeople from Rimavská Sobota
Universiade bronze medalists for the Czech Republic
Medalists at the 2015 Summer Universiade